The  is a Japanese high-speed Shinkansen rail line, connecting Tokyo with Aomori in Aomori Prefecture in a route length of , making it Japan's longest Shinkansen line. It has two Mini-shinkansen branch lines, the Yamagata Shinkansen and Akita Shinkansen. The line is operated by East Japan Railway Company (JR East).

Services
There are four services in operation:
 Hayabusa, Tokyo – Shin-Aomori/Shin-Hakodate-Hokuto limited-stop, starting 5 March 2011
 Hayate, Morioka/Shin-Aomori - Shin-Hakodate-Hokuto limited-stop, starting 26 March 2016 (the name has been in use since 1 December 2002)
 Yamabiko, Tokyo – Sendai limited-stop, and all-stations to Morioka, starting June 1982
 Nasuno, Tokyo – Oyama/Nasushiobara/Kōriyama all-stations, starting 1995
One service has been discontinued:
 Aoba, Tokyo – Sendai all-stations, June 1982 – October 1997 (consolidated with Nasuno)

Through trains on the Akita Shinkansen and Yamagata Shinkansen lines also run on Tōhoku Shinkansen tracks from Morioka and Fukushima respectively.

This should make operating at  possible, if the improved noise dampening techniques being tested using the ALFA-X test train are successful. Upgrade works on this section started in October 2020, and are expected to take seven years to complete.

List of stations

Legend:

Rolling stock
As of March 2020, the following types are used on Tohoku Shinkansen services.
 E2 series: Yamabiko / Nasuno services
 E3 series: Tsubasa / Yamabiko / Nasuno services
 E5 series: Hayabusa / Hayate / Yamabiko / Nasuno services
 E6 series: Komachi / Hayabusa / Yamabiko / Nasuno services
 H5 series: Hayabusa / Hayate / Yamabiko / Nasuno services

Former rolling stock

 200 series: Yamabiko / Nasuno / Aoba services (1982 – November 2011)
 400 series: Tsubasa / Nasuno services (July 1992 – April 2010)
 E1 series: Max Yamabiko / Max Aoba services (July 1994 – December 1999)
 E4 series: Max Yamabiko / Max Nasuno services (until September 2012)

Future rolling stock
 E8 series: Tsubasa / Yamabiko / Nasuno services (from 2024 onwards)

Non-revenue-earning types
 Class E926 East i

Timeline

History
 28 November 1971: Construction starts on the line.
 23 June 1982: The – section opens.
 14 March 1985: The – section opens.
 20 June 1991: The – section opens.
 October 1998: 1 billionth passenger carried on Tōhoku, Joetsu and Nagano Shinkansen lines.
 1 December 2002: The – section opens.
 13 April 2010: Test running starts on the extension from Hachinohe to Shin-Aomori.
 4 December 2010: The extension from Hachinohe to Shin-Aomori opens.
 5 March 2011: New Hayabusa services operating at  commence operation between Tokyo and Shin-Aomori using new E5 series trainsets.
 23 June 2012: The line's 30th anniversary was celebrated, with approximately 1.93 billion passengers having been transported on the line.

From Shin-Aomori, the line continues to Shin-Hakodate in Hokkaido (since March 26, 2016 under the name Hokkaido Shinkansen), passing through the world's longest undersea railway tunnel, the Seikan Tunnel. A further  to Sapporo is due to open by 2030.

The mountainous terrain that the line passes through has necessitated heavy reliance on tunnels. In 2007 the Lötschberg Base Tunnel, and in 2010 the Gotthard Base Tunnel (bored through and due in service by 2016) in Switzerland superseded both.

2011 Tohoku earthquake and tsunami
On the afternoon of 11 March 2011, services on the Tohoku Shinkansen were suspended as a result of the Tōhoku earthquake and tsunami. JR East estimated that around 1,100 repairs would be required for the line between Omiya and Iwate-Numakunai, ranging from collapsed station roofs to bent power pylons.

The line between Morioka and Ichinoseki re-opened on 7 April, Nasushiobara and Fukushima on 12 April, and the rest of the line on or around 30 April, although not at full speed or a full schedule. The trains returned to full-speed operations on 23 September 2011.

2021 Tohoku earthquake 
Following the quake, infrastructure damage was discovered between Shin-Shirakawa and Furukawa stations.

East Japan Railway closed the Tohoku Shinkansen between Nasushiobara and Morioka. The section between Ichinoseki and Morioka re-opened on 16 February, Sendai and Ichinoseki on 22 February, and the remaining section between Nasushiobara and Sendai on 24 February. Trains operated at 80% the usual timetable with top speeds reduced until 26 March, when repairs were completed and the normal timetable was restored.

Special event train services

25th anniversary

On 23 June 2007, 10-car set K47 was used for a special Yamabiko 931 service from Omiya to Morioka to mark the 25th anniversary of the opening of the Tohoku Shinkansen.

30th anniversary
On 23 June 2012, 10-car set K47 was used for a special Yamabiko 235 service from Omiya to Morioka to mark the 30th anniversary of the opening of the Tohoku Shinkansen.

References

 JR Timetable, December 2008

External links

 JR East website 
 Japan blasts longest land tunnel

 
Lines of East Japan Railway Company
High-speed railway lines in Japan
Railway lines opened in 1982
Articles containing video clips
Standard gauge railways in Japan
1982 establishments in Japan
25 kV AC railway electrification